Berbera District is a district of the Sahil province in Somaliland. Its capital lies at Berbera.

Demographics

It is inhabited by people from the CIISE MUUSE, Garhajis and Habr Je'lo sub-clans of the Isaaq Somalis.

See also
Administrative divisions of Somaliland
Regions of Somaliland
Districts of Somaliland

References

External links
 Districts of Somalia
 Administrative map of Berbera District

Districts of Somaliland
Populated places in Sahil, Somaliland